Külalaid is a small island in the Baltic Sea belonging to the country of Estonia.

Külalaid lies just off the northwestern coast of the island of Hiiumaa, as such it is administered by Hiiu County. It lies closest to the Paope coastal area of the island and along with Ninalaid, it is one of the larger of the tiny islets of the area.

See also
 List of islands of Estonia

References

Estonian islands in the Baltic
Hiiumaa Parish